"Hit That" is a song released by the American rock band the Offspring. The song is featured as the fourth track on the band's seventh studio album, Splinter (2003), and was released as its first single. The song also appears as the 13th track on their Greatest Hits (2005).

"Hit That" was released to radio on November 4, 2003. The single was first released in the United States and Australia in December 2003, and in the United Kingdom in January 2004, reaching the top 20 on the Australian ARIA Singles Chart and the UK Singles Chart (No. 13 and No. 11 respectively) and No. 64 on the Billboard Hot 100. The song also topped the Billboard Modern Rock Tracks chart, proving to be one of their most successful singles since the 1990s. This was the first time an Offspring song would hit No. 1 on that chart since their breakthrough single "Come Out and Play" was released a decade earlier in 1994.

Composition
The song's lyrics, as put by Dexter Holland,  are "about the consequences of promiscuity or the idea that no matter what the consequences might be, people are going to be out there doing it with each other", discussing how it results in teenage pregnancy and dysfunctional families. Holland detailed:
"It's about taking responsibility. A generation ago, people were talking about the disintegration of the family because everyone was getting divorced, and how it was taking such a terrible toll on society. Well, you look around nowadays, and it's disintegrated so much more. Joe Blow has got three different kids by three different girls and vice versa, and it's happening more and more. And ultimately the kids are the ones who suffer from that. But when you get down to it, people are gonna hook up, so there's nothing you can do about it."

Music video
The music video for the song, directed by John Williams and David Lea, tried to reflect the irresponsible male of the lyrics not in a literal way, but by telling the story of a dog that turns out to be an amoral force of mayhem, and needed to be caught and neutered to stop its destructive nature. The video combines live-action footage and computer-generated effects, with Williams and Lea playing the part of the dog's owner, a blue man lip-syncing the song's lyrics done by wearing gloves and a mask, onto which digital eyes and mouth were superimposed, to create what Williams described as "a character you can't peg as either completely real or completely computer-generated". To create the same effect on the dog, there was an attempt at making a Great Dane wear a mask, but the dog did not like it, so instead an illuminated muzzle was worn that gave reference for the eventually superimposed animated head. A first draft had caricatures of The Offspring's members through the video, but the band denied that, wanting to avoid something resembling a typical performance video.

The video appears on the Complete Music Video Collection DVD, released in 2005.

Track listing

Personnel
 All songs (on the single) written and performed by the Offspring
 Produced by: Brendan O'Brien
 Mixed by: Brendan O'Brien
 Published by Underachiever Music

Charts

References

External links

The Offspring songs
2003 singles
Songs written by Dexter Holland
Song recordings produced by Brendan O'Brien (record producer)
Comedy rock songs
2003 songs
Columbia Records singles